William Henry Washington (February 7, 1813 – August 12, 1860) was a Whig U.S. Congressman from North Carolina between 1841 and 1843.

Born near Goldsboro, North Carolina, he graduated from Yale College in 1834, where he was a member of Skull and Bones. He then studied law and was admitted to the bar in 1835. Washington practiced law in New Bern. He was elected as a Whig to the 27th United States Congress in 1840, and served a single term before declining re-election.

Following his term in Congress, Washington served in the North Carolina House of Commons in 1843 and 1846 and in the North Carolina Senate in 1848, 1850, and 1852. After his time in politics, he returned to law and died in New Bern in 1860. He is buried in Cedar Grove Cemetery.

References

1813 births
1860 deaths
Members of the North Carolina House of Representatives
Yale College alumni
American people of English descent
William Henry
Politicians from New Bern, North Carolina
North Carolina lawyers
Whig Party members of the United States House of Representatives from North Carolina
19th-century American politicians